Bourgogne-Franche-Comté (sometimes abbreviated BFC; Arpitan: Borgogne-Franche-Comtât) is a region in Eastern France created by the 2014 territorial reform of French regions, from a merger of Burgundy and Franche-Comté. The new region came into existence on 1 January 2016, after the regional elections of December 2015, electing 100 members to the Regional Council of Bourgogne-Franche-Comté.

Its prefecture and largest city is Dijon, although the regional council sits in Besançon, making Bourgogne-Franche-Comté one of two regions in France (along with Normandy) in which the prefect does not sit in the same city as the regional council.

Toponymy
The text of the territorial reform law gives interim names for most of the merged regions, combining the names of their constituent regions separated by hyphens. Permanent names would be proposed by the new regional councils and confirmed by the Conseil d'État by 1 October 2016. Hence the interim name of the new administrative region is composed of the names of former administrative regions of Burgundy and Franche-Comté. The region chose to retain its interim name as its permanent name, a decision made official by the Conseil d'État on 28 September 2016.

The merger represents a historic reunification of the Duchy of Burgundy and the Free County of Burgundy that were created by the partition of the Kingdom of Burgundy in the 843 Treaty of Verdun.

History

Middle Ages
The territory that is now Burgundy and Franche-Comté was already united under the Kingdom of Burgundy (from the 5th to the 8th century). It was divided into two parts: the Duchy of Burgundy (now Burgundy) of France, and the County of Burgundy (now Franche-Comté) of the Holy Roman Empire. The County was reintegrated as a free province within the Kingdom of France in the 17th century, separately from the Duchy which remained a vassal province of the Kingdom of France. These two former provinces were abolished during the French Revolution.

Modern times

Most of the area making up the region of Bourgogne-Franche-Comté used to belong to the former provinces of Burgundy and Franche-Comté, but it also includes a significant part of the former provinces of Nivernais (now Nièvre), Champagne (now the northern part of Yonne), Orléanais (now the southwestern part of Yonne), the Territoire de Belfort (the region of Alsace that remained French territory after 1871) and a small portion of Île-de-France (now the northwestern part of Yonne).

During the formation of the regions of France, Burgundy and Franche-Comté once again became two separate regions, first as public establishments in 1972, then as territorial collectivities in 1982.

On 14 April 2014, François Patriat and Marie-Guite Dufay (the presidents of Burgundy and Franche-Comté, respectively) announced in a press conference the desire for the merger of the two regions, further to the declarations of Prime Minister Manuel Valls, who proposed a simplification of the administrative divisions of France. On 2 June 2014 a map presented by President François Hollande showed the two regions as one. These two regions were the only ones to have voluntarily discussed a merger, and their alliance was the only one not needing revision by the National Assembly or the Senate.

Acte III de la décentralisation officially adopted the merger of the two regions on 17 December 2014. It became effective on 1 January 2016.

Geography 
The region borders Grand Est to the north, Île-de-France to the northwest, Centre-Val de Loire to the west, Auvergne-Rhône-Alpes to the south and Switzerland (the cantons of Vaud, Neuchâtel and Jura) to the east.

The distances from Besançon, where the regional council sits, to other cities, are: Paris, the national capital, ; Bordeaux, ; Toulouse, ; Marseille, ; Lyon, ; Montpellier, ; Nice, .

Departments 
Bourgogne-Franche-Comté comprises eight departments: Côte-d'Or, Doubs, Jura, Nièvre, Haute-Saône, Saône-et-Loire, Yonne, Territoire de Belfort.

Major communities 

The largest communes are (population as of 2017):
 Dijon (156,920; headquarters regional prefecture)
 Besançon (115,934; headquarters regional council)
 Belfort (47,656)
 Chalon-sur-Saône (45,096)
 Auxerre (34,634)
 Mâcon (33,638)
 Nevers (32,990)

Economy 
The gross domestic product (GDP) of the region was €75.6 billion  in 2018, accounting for 3.2% of the total economic output of France. GDP per capita adjusted for purchasing power was €24,200 or 80% of the European Union average in the same year. The GDP per employee was 96 % of the EU average.

Gallery

See also 
 Burgundy
 Franche-Comté
 Regions of France

References

External links

Merger of the regions - France 3

 
Regions of France
2016 establishments in France
States and territories established in 2016